Miandarreh (also Romanized as Mīāndarreh) is a village situated in Kharaqan-e Sharqi Rural District, Abgarm District, Avaj County, Qazvin Province, Iran. At the 2006 census, its population was 11, in 5 families.

References 

Populated places in Avaj County